The 2015 Maine Black Bears football team represented the University of Maine in the 2015 NCAA Division I FCS football season. They were led by 23rd-year head coach Jack Cosgrove and played their home games at Alfond Stadium. They were a member of the Colonial Athletic Association. They finished the season 3–8, 3–5 in CAA play to finish in a four-way tie for seventh place.

On November 24, head coach Jack Cosgrove resigned to become the Senior Associate Director of Athletics at Maine. He finished his coaching career at Maine with a record of 129–135 in 23 seasons.

Schedule

 Source:

Game summaries

Boston College

Tulane

Rhode Island

Richmond

Albany

Yale

Stony Brook

Villanova

Towson

Elon

New Hampshire

2016 NFL draftees

References

Maine
Maine Black Bears football seasons
Maine Black Bears football